WiMP was a music streaming service available on mobile devices, tablets, network players and computers. Music in WiMP was streamed using the AAC+ file format at a bitrate of 96 kbit/s or the AAC file format at a bitrate of 320 kbit/s if the high quality streaming option was selected. WiMP also offered a HiFi-product with FLAC/ALAC. WiMP has since been merged withTidal.

History
WiMP was developed by Aspiro AS and the Norwegian music store chain Platekompaniet AS. It was first launched in Norway in February 2010.

On January 30, 2015, it was announced that Aspiro AB had been acquired by Project Panther Bidco Ltd., which is indirectly owned by S. Carter Enterprises, LLC. The company was controlled by Shawn Corey Carter, better known by his stage name, Jay-Z. Aspiro AB was sold for 464 million SEK, which is about €50 million or US$56 million. However, WiMP would later merge with Tidal under the Tidal name.

Cost and availability

WiMP is funded by paid subscriptions and a one-month free trial is available. As of 2012, WiMP is available in Norway, Denmark, Sweden, Germany and Poland.

Tidal

The service is also available in the U.S., Canada, the UK, Ireland, Finland, the Netherlands, Belgium, Luxembourg, France, Switzerland, Austria, Hungary, Romania and Turkey, where it is known as Tidal; and emphasizes the high-fidelity lossless mode, but the other modes, "High" and "Normal", are also available.  Tidal claims to have 80 million tracks.

Last.fm integration
The application is integrated with Last.fm allowing a track to be "scrobbled".

Buy links
The client interface allows users to purchase tracks in 256 kbit/s DRM-free MP3 format.

Catalog and editorial experience
WiMP gives access to a music library of some 25 million tracks. WiMP has local editors in each country it operates, to present the local and international music and in-app magazines also available online. WiMP also offers music videos, so far available in the Android-client.

Mobile devices
WiMP is available for Android, iOS, Symbian, MeeGo, Windows Phone 7, and Windows Phone 8, as well as Squeezebox, Sonos, Simple Audio, Auralic, Teufel and Bluesound.

See also

 Last.fm
 rara.com
 Spotify
 Grooveshark
 Guvera
 Soundtracker (music streaming)
 List of online music databases
 Comparison of online music stores

References

External links
 

Digital audio
Freeware
Jukebox-style media players
Online music database clients
Online music stores of Norway
Music streaming services